Bethlehem, North Carolina may refer to:
 Bethlehem, Alexander County, North Carolina
 Bethlehem, Hertford County, North Carolina

See also 
 Bethlehem (disambiguation)